Consolidated Gold Fields was a British gold-mining company. It was listed on the London Stock Exchange and was a constituent of the FTSE 100 Index until it was acquired by Hanson in 1988.

History

Consolidated Gold Fields of South Africa was founded in 1887 and incorporated in London to fund the newly discovered gold reefs in the Transvaal. By 1900 it had already started to diversify outside South Africa. After 1945 it acquired mines in the United States and Australia. Until the 1970s, it was predominantly a mining finance house receiving income from passive investments. In 1970 A.R.O. Williams O.B.E, who was then Managing Director, retired.

After the 1970s it transformed itself into natural resource group concentrating on a relatively small number of minerals. The company had three major wholly owned subsidiaries: Amalgamated Roadstone Corporation, Gold fields Corporation and ARC America, both in the United States.

By the late 1980s it was considering withdrawing from South Africa completely. It was then the subject of an acrimonious, hostile and unsuccessful take-over bid by Minorco early in 1988.

Consolidated Gold Fields played a key role in ending apartheid in South Africa; Michael Young, the company's public affairs director embarked on the controversial course of initiating secret discussions between the South African government and the African National Congress at Mells Park House in the company's estate in Somerset. This ultimately resulted in the release of Nelson Mandela in 1990 and the handover of power to majority rule: the events are described in book The Fall of Apartheid by Robert Harvey and the 2009 television film Endgame.

Demise of the business
The company was acquired by Hanson in 1988 for £3.5bn.

References

Further reading
Cartwright, A.P. Gold Paved the Way Macmillan, London 1967. A history of the company.
Heslop, Philip Consolidated Gold Fields plc: investigation under Section 442 of the Companies Act 1985, The Stationery Office, 1994, 

Mining companies of the United Kingdom
Gold mining companies of the United Kingdom
Defunct mining companies of the United Kingdom
Defunct companies based in London
Non-renewable resource companies established in 1887
British companies disestablished in 1988
1887 establishments in England
1988 disestablishments in England
Companies formerly listed on the London Stock Exchange
British companies established in 1887